Liliana Cazac (born 16 June 1976) is a Romanian rower. She competed in the women's coxless pair event teamed with her sister Angela Cazac at the 1996 Summer Olympics.

References

External links
 
 

1976 births
Living people
Romanian female rowers
Olympic rowers of Romania
Rowers at the 1996 Summer Olympics